The London International Stamp Exhibition was held at the Royal Festival Hall from 9 to 16 July 1960. Souvenir labels were produced for the event depicting Colonel Henry Bishop, as it was the tercentenary of the General Post Office. A non-postal souvenir sheet showing six rare stamps was also produced by Harrison and Sons.

Palmares
The principal awards went to the following exhibits:

The Grand Prix went to Reginald M. Phillips (U.K.) for ‘Great Britain’.

Special Awards went to Gerald E. Anderegg (Switzerland) for ‘Switzerland’ and Mario Tomasini (Italy) for ‘Italian States’.

See also
List of philatelic exhibitions (by country)

References

1960
1960 in London
July 1960 events in the United Kingdom